Kotturu Chikkarangappa Raghunath (born 17 April 1965), known by his screen name Rangayana Raghu, is an Indian film and stage actor, known for his work in Kannada cinema. Portraying mostly comic and negative-shaded characters, he has appeared in over 250 films. Prior to acting in films, he worked as a stage actor with B. V. Karanth's theatre group Rangayana, from 1988 to 1999. He made his debut in films in 1995 with Suggi, which got shelved.

Raghu got his major break in films after appearing as an antagonist in Dhumm (2002). He is best noted for his performance in the 2007 film Duniya which won him his second Karnataka State Film Award for Best Supporting Actor. His other notable roles came in Cyanide (2006), Raam (2009), Olave Mandara (2011) and Jayammana Maga (2013). In 2014, his wife Mangala and he started Sanchari Theatre, a theatre training institute for children.

Early life and career
Raghu was born as Kotturu Chikkarangappa Raghunath on 17 April 1965, as the ninth child to Chikkarangaiah and Veeramma, in a village Kotturu, in Pavagada taluk of the Tumkur district of the erstwhile Mysore State (now Karnataka).

Raghu began his acting career as a theatre artist when he joined the Rangayana theatre group in Mysore in 1988, where he received 800 as the monthly salary. He made his film debut in the 1995 Kannada-language film Suggi directed by Hamsalekha that eventually got shelved. He then appeared in the 2002 film Dhumm followed by minor roles in Megha Banthu Megha and Aryabhata. His major breakthrough was Yogaraj Bhat's debut directorial venture Mani. He received critical acclaim for his performances in films like Ranga SSLC, Duniya, Alemari, Modalasala, and Director's Special.

Raghu made his debut in Tulu films in 2018 with My Name is Annappa.

Filmography

 Bhoomi Thayiya Chochchala Maga (1998)...Patil
 Kothigalu Saar Kothigalu (2001)
 Dhumm (2002)
 Sri Ram (2003)...Chakratheertha
 Mani (2003)
  Hrudayavantha (2003)
 Ranga SSLC (2004)...Kunta Naga
 Dharma (2004)
 Sahukara (2004)...Benkiyappa
 Bhagawan (2004)...Sharath Simha
 Sarvabhouma (2004)...Jayaraj
 Omkara (2004)...Divya's father
 Rakshasa (2005)...Cheluvaraju
 Valmiki (2005)...Ballanna
 Gunna (2005)...Sharma
 Swamy (2005)
 Boyfriend (2005)
 Jootaata! (2005)
 Cyanide (2006)...Ranganath
 Thangigagi (2006)...Shadeshwara
 Poojari (2006)
 Tenali Ram (2006)
 Shishya (2006)
 Honeymoon Express (2006)...Ranganath
 Suntaragaali  (2006)...D. Rajahuli
 Tirupathi (2006)
 7 O' Clock (2006)
 Odahuttidavalu (2006)
 Maathaad Maathaadu Mallige (2007)
 Gunavantha (2007)
 Parodi (2007)
 Snehana Preetina (2007)
 Sixer (2007)
 Rajeeva Alla Godse (2007)
 Geleya (2007)
 Duniya (2007)
 Hani Hani (2008)
 Beladingalaagi Baa (2008)
 Gaalipata (2008)
 Payana (2008)
 Inthi Ninna Preethiya (2008)
 Taj Mahal (2008)
 Vasanthakala (2008)
 Avva (2008)
 Dheemaku (2008)
 Mast Maja Maadi (2008)
 Kodagana Koli Nungitha (2008)
 Yuga Yugagale Saagali (2008)
 Minchina Ota (2008)
 Sangama (2008)
 Athmeeya (2008)
 Bidda (2008)
 Rajakumari (2009)
 Prem Kahani (2009)
 Maleyali Jotheyali (2009)
 Raam (2009)
 Olave Jeevana Lekkachaara (2009)...Ratna
 Junglee (2009)
 Mr Painter (2009)
 Nanda (2009)
 Kallara Santhe (2009)
 Rajani (2009)
 Kannadada Kiran Bedi (2009)
 Gubbachchigalu (2009)
 Muniya (2009)
 Jokali (2010)
 Appu and Pappu (2010)
 Ullasa Utsaha (2010)
 Mylari (2010)
 Shankar IPS (2010)
 Gubbi (2010)
 Hendtheer Darbar (2010)
 Sanchari (2010)
 Huli (2010)
 Rame Gowda Vs Krishna Reddy (2010)
 Kari Chirathe (2010)
 Gang Leader (2010)
 Antharathma (2010)
 Dildar (2010)
 Hoo (2010)
 Tsunami (2010)
 Modalasala (2010)
 Jackie (2010)..."Meese" Bheemanna
 Kiccha Huccha (2010)
 Eradane Maduve (2010)
 Gandedhe (2010)
 Aithalakkadi (2010)
 Huduga Hudugi (2010)
 Swayamvara (2010)
 Chiru  (2010)
 Olave Mandara (2011)
 Happy Husband (2011)
 Rama Rama Raghu Rama (2011)
 Kanchana (2011)
 Idonthara Love Story (2011)
 Kaalgejje (2011)
 Rajani (2011)
 Ee Sanje (2011)
 Kool...Sakkath Hot Maga (2011)
 Veerabahu (2011)
 Veera (2011)
 Sarathi (2011)
 Kannadi (2011)
 Lakshmi (2011)
 Alemari (2011)
 Devadas (2011)
 Tyagu (2011)
 Swayam Krushi (2011)
 Auto Manja (2011)
 Jony Mera Naam Preethi Mera Cam (2011)
 Swamiji (2011)
 Sanju Weds Geetha (2011)...Saasa
 O Manase (2011)
 Gun (2011)
 Hudugaru (2011)
 Manase Mandaram (2011)
 Thathaasthu (2011)
 Belgaum (2011)
 Tirugubothu (2011)
 Prince (2011)
 Boss (2011)
 Tumba Ishta Swalpa Kashta (2011)
 90 (2011)
 Paramathma (2011)
 Jarasandha (2011)
 Shyloo (2011)
 Ko Ko (2012)
 Tsunami (2012)
 Chingari (2012)
 Alemari (2012)
 Anna Bond (2012)
 Breaking News (2012)
 Villain (2012)
 Jaanu (2012)
 Dandupalya (2012)
 Shiva (2012)
 Romeo (2012)
 Rambo (2012)...Mangalore Annappa
 Kalaya Tasmai Namaha (2012)
 Mr. 420 (2012)
 Super Shastri (2012)
 Lakshmi (2013)
 Topiwala (2013)
 CID Eesha (2013)...Narasimha 
 Aane Pataaki (2013)
 Director's Special (2013)
 Kaddipudi (2013)...Jinke
 Mahanadi (2013)
 Mangana Kaiyalli Manikya (2013)
 Case No. 18/9 (2013)
 Jayammana Maga (2013)...Bhagavanta
 Shathru (2013 film) (2013)
 Brahma (2014)
 Crazy Star (2014)
 Dil Rangeela (2014)
 Manada Mareyalli (2014)
 Agraja (2014)
 Gajakesari (2014)...Agni
 Preethi Geethi Ityaadi (2014)
 24 Carat (2014)
 Power *** (2014)...P. V. Bhushan
 Jackson (2015)
 Krishna-Leela (2015)...Chandrashekar
 Nagaari (2015)
 Rana Vikrama (2015)
 Daksha (2015)
 Bullet Basya (2015)
 Ganga (2015)
 Ramleela (2015)...Mekedatu Papanna
 Sharpshooter (2015)
 Parapancha (2016)
 U The End A (2016)
 Kala Bhairava (2016)
 The Great Story of Sodabuddi (2016)
 Chakravyuha (2016)...ACP Raghu
 Akira (2016)...Gun Guddappa
 Ishtakamya (2016)
 Style King (2016)...Naga
 Mr. Mommaga (2016)
 Brahma Vishnu Maheshwara (2016)
 Crazy Boy (2016)
 Lifeu Super (2016)
 Golisoda (2016)
 Doddmane Hudga (2016)...Nanjunda
 Dana Kayonu (2016)
 Idolle Ramayana (2016)...Inspector Ramdas
 Nagarahavu (2016)
 Madha Mathu Manasi (2016)
 Naanu Mattu Varalakshmi (2016)
 Sundaranga Jaana (2016)...Anjaneya
 Lee (2017)
 Mumbai (2017)
 Melkote Manja (2017)
 Smile Please (2017)...Sadananda
 Raajakumara (2017)...Venky
 Jani (2017)
 Garuda (2018)
 Mugulu Nage (2017)...Raghu
 Kanaka (2018)
 O Premave (2018)
 Gultoo (2018)...Anantharamaiah
 Johnny Johnny Yes Papa (2018)...Pappa
 Saaguva Daariyalli (2018)
 Hyper (2018)
 Kannadakkagi Ondannu Otthi (2018)
 Aa Karaala Ratri (2018)...Muthanna
 Atharva (2018)
 Loud Speaker (2018)
 Ayogya (2018)
 My Name is Annappa (2018)
 Aadi Purana (2018)
 Jagath Kiladi (2018)
 Orange (2018)...Giddappa
 Girgitle (2019)
 Missing Boy (2019)
 Panchatantra (2019)...Ranganna
 Yaana (2019)
 Dasharatha (2019)
 Ayushman Bhava (2019)...Raghu
 Bharaate (2019)...Patela
 Sarvajanikarige Suvarnavakasha (2019)...Shiva
 Drona (2020)...Raghu
 French Biriyani (2020)...Mahadev
 Ramarjuna (2021)...Peter
 Inspector Vikram (2021)
 Yuvarathnaa (2021)
 Puksatte Lifu (2021)
 Tom and Jerry (2021)
 Mugilpete (2021)
 Sakath (2021)...Chalapathi
 James (2022)...Rakesh Kumar Pirangi
 Gaalipata 2 (2022)...Bhairegowda
 Family Pack (2022)...Manjunath/Manjanna
 Wheelchair Romeo (2022) as Jack mama

Awards and nominations 
Karnataka State Film Awards
 2003–04: Karnataka State Film Award for Best Supporting Actor: Mani
 2006–07: Karnataka State Film Award for Best Supporting Actor: Duniya

Filmfare Awards South
 2006: Filmfare Award for Best Supporting Actor – Kannada: Cyanide
 2009: nominated, Filmfare Award for Best Supporting Actor – Kannada: Raam
 2010: nominated, Filmfare Award for Best Supporting Actor – Kannada: Modalasala
 2011: nominated, Filmfare Award for Best Supporting Actor – Kannada: Olave Mandara
 2013: nominated, Filmfare Award for Best Supporting Actor – Kannada: Jayammana Maga

 South Indian International Movie Awards
 2011: Best Actor in a Negative Role (Kannada): Sanju Weds Geetha
 2012: Best Actor in a Supporting Role (Kannada): Romeo
 2021: Best Actor in a Negative Role
(Kannada): Drona
 2021: Best Comedian
(Kannada): French Biriyani
 2012: nominated, Best Comedian (Kannada): Shiva
 2013: nominated, Best Comedian (Kannada): Jayammana Maga
 2015: nominated, Best Comedian (Kannada): Power***
 2016: nominated, Best Comedian (Kannada): Rana Vikrama
 2022: nominated, Best Comedian (Kannada): Badava Rascal

 Udaya Film Awards
 2010: Best Supporting Actor
 2012: Best Comedian: Mr. 420

 Suvarna Film Awards
 2007: Best Supporting Actor: Duniya
 2009: Best Supporting Actor: Modalasala

 IIFA Utsavam
 2015: nominated, Best Performance In A Supporting Role – Male (Kannada): Krishna Leela
 2015: nominated, Best Performance In A Comic Role (Kannada): Rana Vikrama

 Innovative Film Awards
 2010: Best Supporting Actor

References

External links

Male actors in Kannada cinema
Indian male film actors
People from Tumkur district
Living people
Filmfare Awards South winners
1963 births
20th-century Indian male actors
21st-century Indian male actors
Kannada comedians
Indian male comedians
Male actors from Karnataka
South Indian International Movie Awards winners